The Incredible Casuals was an American rock band based in Cape Cod, Massachusetts. They were formed in 1980 by bassist and songwriter Chandler Travis, guitarist Steve Shook, drummer Vince Valium (also known as Rikki Bates) and guitarist Johnny Spampinato, brother of NRBQ's Joey Spampinato. The band has been described as "The Beach Boys meets the Who". The Incredible Casuals were created from the remnants of "Travis Shook and Club Wow", a comedy duo that opened for George Carlin, Martin Mull and others, appearing on The Tonight Show Starring Johnny Carson and The Midnight Special in the '70s.

Chandler Travis and Steve Shook were joined by drummer Rikki Bates (aka Vince Valium) in 1978 and began performing as The Incredible Casuals in the Boston area in 1980.  The trio released two 45 rpm 7 inch singles, "Money Won't Buy You Happiness" and "That's Why" (Red Rooster Records) prior to the addition of Johnny Spampinato. Johnny joined NRBQ when Al Anderson left that band in 1994, but has remained active with The Incredible Casuals.  After the addition of Johnny to the band, the single "Picnic Ape" (Eat Records) was released. The revised lineup also released the "Let's Go" Maxi-EP, also on Eat records. This lineup of the band was also featured on the USA Network show "Hotspots" along with NRBQ.

Steve Shook left the group prior to the release of their first LP That's That (originally released on Demon Records in the UK and on Rounder Records in the U.S). Shook's songwriting and guitar are prominently featured on the album, which opens and closes with his compositions.

The band's current lineup includes Spampinato, Bates, and Travis, as well as guitarist Aaron Spade, who has written the songs "Burn Me Up" and "Tearin' My Hair Out". The Casuals have maintained one constant through their career, playing the Beachcomber in Wellfleet, Cape Cod every summer Sunday afternoon since 1980. The band has composed over 100 songs.

Their song, "I Wanna Play Loud", is the theme song for most of the "Socky & Jamie" shows.

Discography
 That's That. Rounder, 1987 (CD release in Japan)
 Your Sounds. Sonic Trout, 1991
 Nature Calls. Iddy Biddy, 2005
 World Championship Songs: 1980-2007. Iddy Biddy, 2007
 It is Balloon. Akers Records
 The Future Will Be Better Tomorrow

References

External links
Incredible Casuals website

Rock music groups from Massachusetts
Musical groups established in 1981